This is a list of states in the Holy Roman Empire beginning with the letter H:

References

H